Turkic Languages is a peer-reviewed biannual academic journal published by Harrassowitz. The journal covers research on all aspects of linguistics concerning Turkic languages.

History and profile
Turkic Languages was launched in 1997. The journal is published biannually by Harrassowitz. Its publication is supported by Deutsche Forschungsgemeinschaft (DFG; "German Research Foundation" in English). The editor-in-chief of the journal is Lars Johanson, professor of Turcology at the University of Mainz.

The journal includes contributions on linguistic studies of Turkic languages. In addition, it also publishes review articles, reviews, discussions, reports, and news on recent publications in linguistics. The issues from 1997 to 2010 were digitized by DFG.

References

External links
 

1997 establishments in Germany
Biannual journals
English-language journals
Linguistics journals
Publications established in 1997
Turkic languages